Filomena Linčiūtė-Vaitiekūnienė (born 17 April 1942 in Mažeikiai) is a Lithuanian set designer and painter.

Biography
In 1965, she graduated from the Lithuanian Institute of Fine Arts. She worked at the Lithuanian Radio and Television Committee in 1965–1968, at the Lithuanian Film Studio in 1968–1986, and the Lithuanian National Radio and Television in 1986–1999.

Works
She also worked on the TV show Vizijos ir tikrovė and 12 films, including Devil's Bride in 1974,  in 1976,  in 1980. In 1990s, she created scenic design for events and concerts, including children's song competition  in 1992 and international folklore festival Baltica in 1993.

Linčiūtė-Vaitiekūnienė is also a painter. She created cycles of oil pastels Reflectors of India (1997), Bird LITUA in Quedlinburg (2002), Trees and Towers (2006–2007), The Pathways of the Promised Land (2009). From 1978, she has participated in numerous art exhibitions. Her solo exhibitions were held multiple times in Vilnius, as well as in India, Plungė, Klaipėda, Kaunas,  Mažeikiai, Druskininkai.

See also
List of Lithuanian painters

References

Lithuanian painters
1942 births
Living people
20th-century Lithuanian women artists
21st-century Lithuanian women artists
People from Mažeikiai